Ruth Stiles Gannett Kahn (born August 12, 1923) is an American children's writer best known for My Father's Dragon and its two sequels—collectively sometimes called the My Father's Dragon or the Elmer and the Dragons series or trilogy.

Education
Gannett graduated from City and Country School in Greenwich Village, New York City, in the class of 1937. There, she recalled in 2012, "she benefited from being 'allowed and encouraged to write for fun' at certain times of the day". She then attended the George School and Vassar College, graduating with a B.A. in chemistry in 1944.

Early career
After graduating from Vassar, Gannett moved to Boston where she worked at Boston General Hospital and then at the Massachusetts Radiation Laboratory. She then worked at a ski lodge, and afterward returned to live with her parents which is where she completed work on her most defining work. In 1947 the year her seminal work was published she married Peter Kahn.

Writing career
Gannett's first novel, My Father's Dragon, was published by Random House in 1948 and was a runner-up for the annual Newbery Medal recognizing the year's "most distinguished contribution" to American children's literature. She wrote two more novels in that series, Elmer and the Dragon and The Dragons of Blueland. The books were illustrated by Ruth Chrisman Gannett, her stepmother, and the typography was designed by her husband, H. Peter Kahn. They have been translated into fourteen languages.

Gannett wrote two other short children's novels, The Wonderful House-Boat-Train (1949) and Katie and the Sad Noise (1961), illustrated by Fritz Eichenberg and Ellie Simmons.

Kirkus Reviews covered two of the books briefly, showing disappointment in both Gannett's and Eichenberg's work on the house-boat-train and unusual enthusiasm for Gannett's story in a starred review of The Dragons of Blueland.

Personal life
Ruth Gannett married artist, art history professor, and calligrapher H. Peter Kahn, (1921–1997). The couple had seven daughters and eight grandchildren at the time of Kahn's death. She lives near Trumansburg, New York, near Cornell University, where Peter Kahn was employed for forty years. She is the great-granddaughter of Ezra Stiles Gannett.

Works

My Father's Dragon series
Sometimes called the "Elmer and the Dragons series", the three short novels were written by Ruth Stiles Gannett and illustrated by her stepmother Ruth Chrisman Gannett.
 My Father's Dragon (Random House, 1948)
 Elmer and the Dragon (Random House, 1950)
 The Dragons of Blueland (Random House, 1951)
50th Anniversary omnibus edition: Three Tales of My Father's Dragon (Random House, 1998), .

Other
 The Wonderful House-boat-train, illustrated by Fritz Eichenberg (Random, 1949), 63 pp. 
 Katie and the Sad Noise, illus. Ellie Simmons (Random, 1961), 61 pp.  

Gannett introduced the 1991 Yearling edition of Edith Nesbit's collection The Book of Dragons, later issued in the Looking Glass Library (2013).

Notes

References

External links
 Author biography from Random House
 Information on Ruth Stiles Gannett
 
 
 
 
 
 Ruth Chrisman Gannett at LC Authorities, with 16 records (mainly under 'Gannett, Ruth Chrisman' without '1896–1979', previous page of browse report)

1923 births
Living people
American children's writers
Newbery Honor winners
People from Trumansburg, New York
Vassar College alumni
Writers from New York City